William Mayhew (2 March 1787 – 26 April 1855) was a British politician.

The eldest child of three sons and a daughter born to William and Hannah Mayhew, of Coggeshall, Mayhew's father was a victualler and innkeeper who had formerly earned his living as a woolcomber. The Mayhew family were of some distinction, being descendants of Augustine Mayhew (1622-1693), an attorney and lord of the manors of Great and Little Coggeshall, and William Mayhew (c. 1736–1787), a barrister, bencher of Gray's Inn, high steward and recorder of Colchester, and recorder of Ipswich and Aldeburgh.

Second son Thomas became a cabinet maker at Coggeshall; the third brother, James, later a brandy merchant, was a partner in William's business as a wine, beer and spirit merchant in London. William was declared bankrupt in 1843. Mayhew was the Whig Member of Parliament (MP) for Colchester, Essex from 9 April 1831 to 1832.

Mayhew lived at Camberwell, Surrey. He was survived by his widow and children, including son William, who administered his father's estate.

References

1787 births
1855 deaths
Members of the Parliament of the United Kingdom for English constituencies
UK MPs 1831–1832
Whig (British political party) MPs for English constituencies